Zalas may refer to the following places:
Zalas, Lesser Poland Voivodeship (south Poland)
Zalas, Ostrołęka County in Masovian Voivodeship (east-central Poland)
Zalas, Wyszków County in Masovian Voivodeship (east-central Poland)